Kazuaki Minami (born August 27, 1981) is a Japanese former pitcher.

He was born in Hyōgo, Japan. Prior to playing professionally, he attended Shinko Gakuen High School and then Fukui Kogyo University.

Minami made two relief appearances for the Yomiuri Giants of Nippon Professional Baseball in 2004, pitching two innings, allowing four hits and no walks, while striking out two batters. His ERA was 9.00. After spending a couple years in ni-gun (Japanese minor league baseball), he joined the Calgary Vipers of the Northern League in 2007. In 24 games (17 starts), he went 10–5 with a 5.52 ERA, pitching 122 1/3 innings, allowing 173 hits and 38 walks and striking out 78 batters.

Following his year with Calgary, he went to pitch with Ishikawa Million Stars in the Baseball Challenge League in Japan.

References

1981 births
Living people
Calgary Vipers players
Ishikawa Million Stars players
Japanese expatriate baseball players in Canada
Nippon Professional Baseball pitchers
Baseball people from Hyōgo Prefecture
Yomiuri Giants players